The Shrine of Our Lady of Lebanon (also known as Our Lady of Harissa, Sayyidat Lubnān) is a Marian shrine and a pilgrimage site in the village of Harissa in Lebanon.

The shrine belongs to the Maronite Patriarchate who entrusted its administration to the Congregation of Maronite Lebanese Missionaries since its foundation in 1904 and also to the jesuit Lucien Cattin, according to Christian Taoutel (Lebanese historian from the Saint Joseph University). It is one of the most important shrines in the world honoring Mary, Mother of Jesus. The shrine is highlighted by a huge, 15-ton bronze statue. It is 8.5 m high, and has a diameter of five meters. The Virgin Mary stretches her hands towards Beirut.

The Shrine of Our Lady of Lebanon draws millions of faithful both Christians and Muslims from all over the world. The 50th jubilee in 1954 was also the hundredth anniversary of the establishment of the Catholic dogma of the Immaculate Conception. During these celebrations, Pope Pius XII sent his representative, Cardinal Angelo Roncalli (later to become Pope John XXIII) to Lebanon. Pope John Paul II visited Our Lady of Lebanon in 1997.

The Congregation of Maronite Lebanese Missionaries, responsible for the administration, works at reinforcing relations among all local Churches, Christian communities and apostolic movements.

The Lebanese Christians as well as the Druze and Muslims have a special devotion to Mary, Mother of Jesus. The Maronite Patriarch of Antioch named her the "Queen of Lebanon" in 1908 upon completion of the shrine.  Overlooking the bay of Jounieh, the shrine has become a major tourist attraction where tourists take the gondola lift, the Téléphérique, from the city of Jounieh to Harissa.

History
The Statue of Our Lady of Lebanon is a French-made, 13-ton statue, made of bronze and painted white, of the Virgin Mary. It was erected in 1907 on top of a hill, 650 meters above sea level, in the village of Harissa, 20 km north of Beirut in honor of Our Lady of Lebanon. The land was donated by Yousef Khazen. It was made up of seven sections that were assembled on top of the stone base, which had a bottom perimeter of 64m, an upper perimeter of 12m and with an overall height of 20m.  The height of the statue is 8.50m while its diameter is 5.50m. The statue and the shrine were inaugurated in 1908, and it has become a major pilgrimage destination.

Papal Visit

Pope John Paul II visited the shrine when he made an official visit to Lebanon on May 10, 1997.  He conducted a mass in the modern Basilica. On December 8, 1998, the Vatican announced that the World Day of the Sick would be celebrated on February 11, 1999, at Our Lady of Lebanon in Harissa.  Pope John Paul II prayed that Our Lady of Lebanon who had watched over the agonizing suffering of the Lebanese people could help all those who were suffering in the world.

Pope Benedict XVI launched an appeal for peace in Lebanon and Gaza by invoking the protection of Our Lady of Lebanon on January 28, 2007.  He said, "To Christians in Lebanon, I repeat the exhortation to be promoters of real dialogue between the various communities, and upon everyone I invoke the protection of Our Lady of Lebanon."

The Apostolic Nuncio to Lebanon as well as the residences of four Eastern Catholic Churches patriarchs reside in the vicinity of the shrine of Our Lady of Lebanon.

Image gallery

Churches, schools, and shrines dedicated to Our Lady of Lebanon

Argentina
Instituto Nuestra Señora del Libano, San Martin, Mendoza, Argentina
Parroquia Nuestra Señora del Libano, Buenos Aires, Argentina

Australia
Our Lady Of Lebanon Maronite Catholic Church, Melbourne VIC
Our Lady Of Lebanon Maronite Catholic Church, Harris Park, Sydney, NSW
Our Lady of Lebanon College, Harris Park, Sydney, NSW
Our Lady of Lebanon Maronite Catholic Church, West Wollongong NSW

Brazil

Our Lady of Lebanon Melkite Church, Fortaleza
Our Lady of Lebanon Square, Visconde do Rio Branco, Minas Gerais
Our Lady Of Lebanon Maronite Catholic Church, Belo Horizonte, MG
Our Lady of Lebanon Cathedral, São Paulo, SP
Our Lady of Lebanon Parish, Porto Alegre, RS
Our Lady of Lebanon Church, Rio de Janeiro, RJ

Canada
Our Lady Of Lebanon Maronite Catholic Church, Halifax, Nova Scotia
Our Lady Of Lebanon Maronite Catholic Church, Toronto, Ontario
Our Lady Of Lebanon Maronite Catholic Church and Shrine, Leamington, Ontario

Colombia
 *Our Lady of Lebanon Procathedral, Bogotá, a.k.a. Church of Santa Clara de Assís

France
Notre Dame du Liban, Paris, France, seat of the Maronite Catholic Eparchy of Our Lady of Lebanon of Paris

Mexico
 Our Lady of Valvanera Cathedral, Mexico City, seat of the Maronite Catholic Eparchy of Our Lady of the Martyrs of Lebanon in Mexico

South Africa 

 Shrine of Our Lady of the Cedars of Lebanon, Woodmead, Johannesburg
The Maronite Catholic Church, Mulbarton, Johannesburg

United Kingdom 
Our Lady of Lebanon Parish – London

United States

California
Mariam Mother of Life Shrine (replica of Our Lady of Lebanon) at St. Ephrem's Maronite Catholic Church – El Cajon, California
Maronite Eparchy of Our Lady of Lebanon – Los Angeles, California
Our Lady of Mount Lebanon – Los Angeles, California
Our Lady of Lebanon Maronite Antiochene Catholic Church – Millbrae, California

Connecticut
Our Lady of Lebanon Maronite Catholic Church, Waterbury, Connecticut

District of Columbia
Our Lady of Lebanon Chapel, Basilica of the National Shrine of the Immaculate Conception, Washington, D.C.
Our Lady of Lebanon Parish, Washington, D.C.
Our Lady of Lebanon Seminary, Washington, D.C.

Florida
Our Lady of Lebanon Maronite Catholic Church, Miami, Florida

Illinois
Our Lady of Lebanon Maronite Catholic Church, Lombard, Illinois

Massachusetts
Our Lady of the Cedars of Lebanon, Boston, Massachusetts

Michigan
Our Lady of Lebanon Maronite Catholic Church, Flint, Michigan

Missouri
Catholic Eparchy of Our Lady of Lebanon, Saint Louis, Missouri

New York
Our Lady of Lebanon Maronite Cathedral (Brooklyn)
Our Lady of Lebanon Parish (1914 Maronite; 1934 Roman), Niagara Falls, New York

Ohio
Our Lady of Lebanon Maronite Mission, Columbus, Ohio
Basilica and National Shrine of Our Lady of Lebanon (North Jackson, Ohio)

Oklahoma
Our Lady of Lebanon Catholic Church, Norman, Oklahoma

Pennsylvania
Our Lady of Lebanon Maronite Catholic Church, Easton, Pennsylvania

Texas
Our Lady of Lebanon Maronite Catholic Church, Austin, Texas
Our Lady of the Cedars Maronite Catholic Church, Houston, Texas
Our Lady of Lebanon Maronite Catholic Church, Lewisville, Texas

West Virginia
Our Lady of Lebanon Maronite Catholic Church, Wheeling, West Virginia

Uruguay
Our Lady of Lebanon Parish Church, Montevideo

See also 
 Our Lady of Lebanon Cathedral (disambiguation)

References

External links
 Our Lady of Lebanon – Harissa
 Congregation of the Maronite Lebanese Missionaries
 OpusLibani
 Pope's visit in Lebanon
 Maronite Eparchy of Australia
 Eparchy of Saint Maron – Canada (ESMC)

Shrines to the Virgin Mary
Eastern Catholic shrines
Titles of Mary
Catholic devotions
Melkite Greek Catholic Church in Lebanon
Maronite Church in Lebanon
Maronite church buildings in Lebanon
Roman Catholic shrines in Lebanon
Sufi shrines
Shia shrines
Tourist attractions in Lebanon